In geometry, an 8-orthoplex or 8-cross polytope is a regular 8-polytope with 16 vertices, 112 edges,  448 triangle faces, 1120 tetrahedron cells, 1792 5-cells 4-faces, 1792 5-faces, 1024 6-faces, and 256 7-faces.

It has two constructive forms, the first being regular with Schläfli symbol {36,4}, and the second with alternately labeled (checkerboarded) facets, with Schläfli symbol {3,3,3,3,3,31,1} or Coxeter symbol 511.

It is a part of an infinite family of polytopes, called cross-polytopes or orthoplexes. The dual polytope is an 8-hypercube, or octeract.

Alternate names 
 Octacross, derived from combining the family name cross polytope with oct for eight (dimensions) in Greek
 Diacosipentacontahexazetton as a 256-facetted 8-polytope (polyzetton)

As a configuration
This configuration matrix represents the 8-orthoplex. The rows and columns correspond to vertices, edges, faces, cells, 4-faces, 5-faces, 6-faces and 7-faces. The diagonal numbers say how many of each element occur in the whole 8-orthoplex. The nondiagonal numbers say how many of the column's element occur in or at the row's element.

The diagonal f-vector numbers are derived through the Wythoff construction, dividing the full group order of a subgroup order by removing individual mirrors.

Construction 

There are two Coxeter groups associated with the 8-cube, one regular, dual of the octeract with the C8 or [4,3,3,3,3,3,3] symmetry group, and a half symmetry with two copies of 7-simplex facets, alternating, with the D8 or [35,1,1] symmetry group. A lowest symmetry construction is based on a dual of an 8-orthotope, called an 8-fusil.

Cartesian coordinates 
Cartesian coordinates for the vertices of an 8-cube, centered at the origin are
 (±1,0,0,0,0,0,0,0), (0,±1,0,0,0,0,0,0), (0,0,±1,0,0,0,0,0), (0,0,0,±1,0,0,0,0), 
 (0,0,0,0,±1,0,0,0), (0,0,0,0,0,±1,0,0), (0,0,0,0,0,0,0,±1), (0,0,0,0,0,0,0,±1)

Every vertex pair is connected by an edge, except opposites.

Images 

It is used in its alternated form 511 with the 8-simplex to form the 521 honeycomb.

References

 H.S.M. Coxeter: 
 H.S.M. Coxeter, Regular Polytopes, 3rd Edition, Dover New York, 1973 
 Kaleidoscopes: Selected Writings of H.S.M. Coxeter, edited by F. Arthur Sherk, Peter McMullen, Anthony C. Thompson, Asia Ivic Weiss, Wiley-Interscience Publication, 1995,  
 (Paper 22) H.S.M. Coxeter, Regular and Semi Regular Polytopes I, [Math. Zeit. 46 (1940) 380-407, MR 2,10]
 (Paper 23) H.S.M. Coxeter, Regular and Semi-Regular Polytopes II, [Math. Zeit. 188 (1985) 559-591]
 (Paper 24) H.S.M. Coxeter, Regular and Semi-Regular Polytopes III, [Math. Zeit. 200 (1988) 3-45]
 Norman Johnson Uniform Polytopes, Manuscript (1991)
 N.W. Johnson: The Theory of Uniform Polytopes and Honeycombs, Ph.D.

External links 

 Polytopes of Various Dimensions
 Multi-dimensional Glossary

8-polytopes